Faking may refer to:

Music
Miming in instrumental performance (pretending to play an instrument)
Faking (Western classical music) (pretending to play a difficult section of orchestral music)
Lip-synching (pretending to sing in a concert)
Backing track (using pre-recorded music in a live show)
Faking (jazz) (providing improvised accompaniment in jazz)

Other contexts
Fake news
Fake orgasm
Poseur (a person pretending to be part of a subculture)
Charlatan (a person pretending to be a member of a certain profession)

See also
 Fake (disambiguation)
 Fakir